José Antonio Souto Paz (9 October 1938 – 8 September 2017) was a Spanish jurist, academic and politician who served as the first democratic Mayor of Santiago de Compostela from 1979 to 1981 following Spain's transition to democracy.

A jurist by profession, Souto also served as the dean of the Faculty of Law at the University of Santiago de Compostela. He later served as a deputy in the national Congress of Deputies, representing the Province of A Coruña, from 1989 until 1993, as well as an advisor of the regional ombudsman.

José Antonio Souto died in Madrid on 8 September 2017 at the age of 78.

References

1938 births
2017 deaths
Members of the Congress of Deputies (Spain)
Politicians from Galicia (Spain)
Union of the Democratic Centre (Spain) politicians
People from Pontevedra
Mayors of places in Galicia
People from Santiago de Compostela